The 1936 Missouri gubernatorial election was held on November 3, 1936 and resulted in a victory for the Democratic nominee, Lloyd C. Stark, over the Republican nominee, former Missouri Attorney General Jesse W. Barrett, and several other candidates representing minor parties.

Results

References

Missouri
1936
Gubernatorial
November 1936 events